
The  is a professional wrestling single-elimination tag team tournament created by Kyushu Pro-Wrestling. Launched in 2021, the tournament aims to showcase local independent promotions from all over Japan.

List of winners

Results

2021

The first edition of the tournament was held between October 4 and December 6, 2021, and featured eight teams.

2022

The second edition of the tournament ran from October 4 to December 3, 2022, and featured 16 teams. This edition was hosted by an executive committee of five organizations: Ryukyu Dragon Pro-Wrestling, Kyushu Pro-Wrestling, Michinoku Pro Wrestling, Osaka Pro Wrestling and Active Advance Pro Wrestling (2AW).

References

Notes

Footnotes

External links

Tag team tournaments